Valentina Orlova (born 19 April 1993) is a Russian football defender, currently playing for Zvezda Perm.

International career

Honours 
Zvezda Perm
Winner
 Russian Women's Football Championship: 2014, 2015, 2017
 Russian Women's Cup: 2012, 2013, 2015, 2016

Runners-up
 Russian Women's Football Championship: 2013, 2016

References

External links

FOOTBALL CAREER TRANSFERS AND STATISTICS 
We are going to show you the list of football clubs and seasons in which Valentina Orlova has played. It includes the total number of appearance (caps), substitution details, goals, yellow and red cards stats.

1993 births
Living people
Russian women's footballers
Russia women's international footballers
Women's association football defenders
Zvezda 2005 Perm players
CSK VVS Samara (women's football club) players
Sportspeople from Samara, Russia